Athletics in Pakistan is overseen by the Athletics Federation of Pakistan (AFP) organizes athletic tournaments in Pakistan. Pakistani athletes compete in various athletic events. Some Pakistani athletes have excelled in various events in the distant past including Abdul Khaliq, Ghulam Raziq, Mubarak Shah, John Permal, Muhammad Talib, Ahmed Sajjad Cheema, Abid Hussain, Arshad Saleem, Ali Kamani and Nawaz, Mohammad Alam, and Muhammad Younis are some of the athletes who got prominence at either Asian or International levels, or both, winning gold medals for Pakistan. In the early decades, Pakistanis held many Asian records including the Asian 100 m and 200 m record held by Abdul Khaliq. Pakistani female athletes have also represented Pakistan at international level, such as Shabana Akhtar, who was the first Pakistani female athlete to participate at the Olympics. International events such as the Lahore Marathon take place in the country. There have been many Pakistani records in athletics.

Athletics is an exclusive collection of sporting events that involve competitive running, jumping, throwing, and walking. The most common types of athletics competitions are track and field, road running, cross country running, and race walking. The simplicity of the competitions, and the lack of a need for expensive equipment, makes athletics one of the most commonly competed sports in the world. Athletics is mostly an individual sport, with the exception of relay races and competitions which combine athletes' performances for a team score, such as cross country.

National Championship 
National Athletics Championships is held annually by the Athletics Federation of Pakistan. 50th edition will be held in 2021 with 14 teams participating.

See also
 Sport in Pakistan
 List of Pakistani records in athletics

References

 
Pakistan
Athletics
Pakistan